Sazhnoye is a rural locality (a selo) and the administrative center of Sazhenskoye Rural Settlement, Yakovlevsky District, Belgorod Oblast, Russia. The population was 241 as of 2010. There are 7 streets.

Geography 
Sazhnoye is located 22 km east of Stroitel (the district's administrative centre) by road. Krivtsovo is the nearest rural locality.

References 

Rural localities in Yakovlevsky District, Belgorod Oblast